Teinoptera olivina is a moth of the family Noctuidae. It is found in Morocco, Spain, France, Switzerland, Italy, Austria, Yugoslavia, North Macedonia, Romania, Bulgaria, Albania, Greece, Turkey, Algeria, Tunisia, Arabia and Saudi Arabia.

Adults are on wing from May to July.

The larvae feed on Dianthus and Acantholiman species

Subspecies
Teinoptera olivina olivina
Teinoptera olivina deliblatica (eastern Europe)
Teinoptera olivina pseudoliva (Turkey)

External links
Fauna Europaea
Lepiforum.de

Cuculliinae
Moths of Europe
Moths of Asia
Taxa named by Gottlieb August Wilhelm Herrich-Schäffer